Mordellistena sexnotata is a species of beetle in the genus Mordellistena of the family Mordellidae. It was described by Dury in 1902.

References

External links
Coleoptera. BugGuide.

Beetles described in 1902
sexnotata